Lorna Pegram born Lorna Gladys Hurst Woods (October 25, 1926 – May 16, 1993) was a British television producer and novelist. She produced The Shock of the New, a series about the development of modern art for the BBC. Pegram wrote seven novels.

Life
Pegram was born in Ilford in 1926. Her parents were Sybil (born Hurst) and Reginald William James Woods.

She obtained a first class degree at King's College, London and then she worked for the BBC working on the radio programmes Listen with Mother and she read readers letters on Woman's Hour. In the fifties she worked on the TV programmes The Wednesday Magazine and Look of the Week.

In the late 1960s she began her association with Robert Hughes who was an art critic born in Australia.

In 1969 Carmen Callil, who was the publicity manager for Panther Books, persuaded Pegram to include B. S. Johnson to talk about his book The Unfortunates for the BBC art series Release. Johnson's book had 8 parts that could be read in many different orders. With barely any negotiation the interview was ready months before the book was ready for publication. The film included Johnson holding a mock-up of the book that was not at all similar to the final publication.

She produced the BBC TV series The Shock of the New about the development of modern art with her frequent collaborator Robert Hughes. The series of eight programmes took three years to create and despite using archive film, Hughes had to travel about 250,000 miles to present his thoughts about particular places or people.

The series was broadcast by the BBC in 1980 and by PBS the following year in the United States. It addressed the development of modern art since the Impressionists and was accompanied by a book of the same name; its combination of insight, wit and accessibility are still widely praised. Hughes remembers being directed by Pegram with her saying, "It's a clever argument, Bob dear, but what are we supposed to be looking at?".

In 1983 she produced and directed two films presented by the American art historian Vincent Scully. The films were for the Met and WNET based around art at the Met.

Writing
Pegram left the BBC in 1984 and took to writing her novels full time. None of them became best sellers but they were well regarded. Her 1969 novel Summer Fires was thought to be one of her best.

Private life
Pegram married twice, the first time was in 1947 to fellow student Roy William Pegram and after they divorced she kept the surname. In 1961 she married Geoffrey Charles Newton Golden who was in advertising. She had three sons - two with Pegram and one with Golden. Pegram died of lung cancer in Deal in 1993.

References

1926 births
1993 deaths
People from Ilford
British women television producers
British women novelists
20th-century British novelists